Neiden Chapel is a parish church of the Church of Norway in Sør-Varanger Municipality in Troms og Finnmark county, Norway. It is located in the village of Neiden. It is one of the churches for the Sør-Varanger parish which is part of the Varanger prosti (deanery) in the Diocese of Nord-Hålogaland. The red and white, wooden church was built in a long church format in the style called dragestil in 1902 by the architect Karl Norum. The church seats about 155 people.

History
In 1898, many farmers in Neiden made a request to the Ministry of Church and Education to have a church and a cemetery built in Neiden. Only four years later, the church was finished. The residents' desire to have a church coincided with the government's desire to secure the border from Finnish-Russian expansion, and a Norwegian church near the border would help. Architect Karl Norum was very keen on old Norwegian stave churches, and he created a dragestil building that would be an expression of Norwegian culture and national cohesion in a border area. The chapel had 155 seats and it cost  at that time. The chapel was consecrated on 13 July 1902.

Russian Orthodox chapel

There is also a Russian Orthodox chapel located nearby in Neiden, built in the 16th century as a part of Russian Christianisation of the Skolt samis who were the inhabitants of the area at that time.

Media gallery

See also
List of churches in Nord-Hålogaland

References

Sør-Varanger
Churches in Finnmark
Wooden churches in Norway
20th-century Church of Norway church buildings
Churches completed in 1902
1902 establishments in Norway
Long churches in Norway